Matt Elliott is an English guitarist and singer-songwriter, originally from Bristol, England and now based in France, who plays dark folk music. He also produced and recorded electronic music under the name The Third Eye Foundation.

Biography

Elliott started recording with the band Linda's Strange Vacation, which included Kate Wright (Movietone) and Rachel Brook (Movietone/Flying Saucer Attack), around the time Wright and Brook formed Movietone, and Brook and Dave Pearce formed Flying Saucer Attack. Elliott was a part-time member of both bands.

He recorded Semtex, his first album under the name The Third Eye Foundation, and released it on his own record label, Linda's Strange Vacation, with the help of the fledgling Domino Recording Company. The next three albums were released on Domino in 1997, 1998 and 2000.

As Third Eye Foundation, Elliott worked with bands and artists including Amp, Hood, Yann Tiersen, Mogwai, Ulver, Tarwater, The Pastels, Navigator, Urchin, Suncoil Sect, Remote Viewer, Thurston Moore primarily as a remixer. In 2001, a compilation album of his remixes was released.

In 2003, he released his first album under his own name, The Mess We Made, which marked a stylistic shift from The Third Eye Foundation releases. The next three albums were released as a trilogy on the French label Ici, d'ailleurs.... By the release of Drinking Songs (2004), his sound had changed considerably from his earlier work, now being compared to Tindersticks and The Black Heart Procession.

On Yann Tiersen's 2009 tour, Elliott was support act, and later in the show was part of Yann's band onstage.

Discography 
All recordings were released under the Third Eye Foundation name up to and including 2001's I Poo Poo on Your Juju, later recordings were released under Elliott's own name. 2010's The Dark was again released under The Third Eye Foundation.

Studio albums

As The Third Eye Foundation 
 Semtex (1996, Linda's Strange Vacation)
 In Version (1996, Linda's Strange Vacation) – remixes of tracks by Flying Saucer Attack, Amp, Crescent, Hood.
 Ghost (1997, Domino)
 You Guys Kill Me (1998, Domino)
 Little Lost Soul (2000, Domino)
 I Poo Poo on Your JuJu (2001, Domino) – remixes of tracks by Yann Tiersen, Tarwater, Urchin, The Remote Viewer, Chris Morris, Blonde Redhead, Faultline and Glanta.
 The Dark (2010, Ici, d'ailleurs...)
 Wake the Dead (2018, Ici, d'ailleurs...)

As Matt Elliott  
 The Mess We Made (2003, Merge)
 OuMuPo (2004, 0101 music) – 42 minute remix of Ici d'ailleurs back catalogue with a set of rules
 Drinking Songs (2005, Ici, d'ailleurs.../Acuarela Records)
 Failing Songs (2006, Ici, d'ailleurs.../Acuarela Records)
 Collected Works (2006, Domino) – combines Ghost, You Guys Kill Me and  Little Lost Soul, plus extra tracks
 Howling Songs (2008, Ici, d'ailleurs...)
 Failed Songs (2009, Ici, d'ailleurs...)
 The Broken Man (2012, Ici, d'ailleurs...)
 Only Myocardial Infarction Can Break Your Heart (2013, Ici, d'ailleurs...)
 The Calm Before (2016, Ici, d'ailleurs...)
 Songs of Resignation (2018, self published)
 Selected Works (2019, Ici, d'ailleurs...)
 Farewell to All We Know (2020, Ici, d'ailleurs...)
 The End of Days (2023, Ici, d'ailleurs...)

Singles
 "Universal Cooler" (1996, Planet Records)
 "Semtex" (1997, Domino)
 "Stars Are Down" (1997, 7" given away with Obsessive Eye magazine, split with KS Kollective)
 "Sound of Violence" (1997, Domino)
 "There's No End in Sight" (1998, Fat Cat Records, split with V/Vm)
 "Fear of a Wack Planet" (1998, Domino)
 "In Bristol with a Pistol" (1999, Domino)
 "What Is It With You?" (2000, Domino)
 "Borderline Schizophrenic" (2003, Domino)

Filmography
 "What a Fuck Am I Doing on This Battlefield" – documentary by Nico Peltier and Julien Fezans (2013, 53min)

References

External links
 

Living people
British male guitarists
English electronic musicians
Merge Records artists
21st-century classical composers
Apocalyptic folk musicians
21st-century British male musicians
Year of birth missing (living people)
Musicians from Bristol